Polixénia Daniel (1720–1775), was a Hungarian noble, philanthropist and writer.

She was the daughter of baron Daniel Stephen and married baron Wesselényi István in 1742. She became known for her great learning, her charitable projects and as a protector of artists and scientists. She was also active as a writer, and several manuscripts of her hand survives. Her daughter, Zsuzsanna Wesselényi (1744–1800), became known for her diary.

References

 Gudenus János József: A magyarországi főnemesség XX. századi genealógiája SZ–ZS, Heraldika Kiadó, Budapest, 1998., 263. o. 

1720 births
1775 deaths
18th-century Hungarian women writers
Hungarian nobility